Skullcap or skull cap usually refers to various types of headgear. Specifically it may refer to:

Headwear
 Beanie (seamed cap)
 Biretta, forming part of some clerical, academic or legal dress
 Calotte (Belgium), a skullcap worn by students at Catholic universities in Belgium
 Capeline, worn under civilian hats during early modern periods
 Cervelliere, a medieval metal helmet
 Jeep cap
 Kippah or yarmulke, worn by Jewish men
 Kufi, worn primarily by men of West African heritage
 Scrum cap, worn by rugby players
 Sindhi cap worn by Sindhi people of Pakistan, and others
 Scrubs (clothing)#Scrub caps, worn by healthcare professionals while performing procedures
 Taqiyah (cap), worn by some Muslim men
 Tubeteika, a Central Asian cap
 Tuque, a knit hat
 Zucchetto, worn by Catholic clergy

Plants
 Galerina marginata, a poisonous mushroom also known as "deadly skullcap"  or "autumn skullcap"
 Scutellaria, a genus of flowering plants also known as "skullcaps"
 Scutellaria baicalensis ("Baikal skullcap", "Chinese skullcap"), an herb native to eastern Asia
 Scutellaria lateriflora ("blue skullcap", "American skullcap", "mad dog skullcap", "side-flowering skullcap"), a perennial herb native to North America

See also 
 Calvaria (skull), the top part of the skull